Dr APJ Abdul Kalam Missile Complex  is a military missile research center in Hyderabad, India.

Laboratories 
The complex has following three laboratories:

 Advanced Systems Laboratory (ASL): Conducts research and development on motors, jet vanes and structures for launch vehicles and missiles, primarily known for contributions to Agni Missiles.
 Defence Research and Development Laboratory (DRDL): famous for its contributions to Integrated Guided Missile Development Programme (IGMDP).
 Research Centre Imarat (RCI): A missile Avionics Laboratory founded by Dr A. P. J. Abdul Kalam.

History 
Defence Minister, Manohar Parrikar on 15 October 2015 renamed DRDO Missile Complex at Hyderabad into Dr APJ Abdul Kalam Missile Complex.

See also

 Guided missiles of India
 Indian Human Spaceflight Programme
 Indian Armed Forces
 Indian weapons of mass destruction

References

Aeronautics organizations
Defence Research and Development Organisation
Organisations based in Hyderabad, India
Research institutes in Hyderabad, India
Science and technology in Hyderabad, India
Year of establishment missing